Hin Shen (also) or Kichik Galadarasi is a village de facto in the Shushi Province of the breakaway Republic of Artsakh, de jure in the Shusha District of Azerbaijan, in the disputed region of Nagorno-Karabakh. The village has an ethnic Armenian-majority population, and also had an Armenian majority in 1989.

Toponymy 
The village was known as Kirov during the Soviet period, and is also known as Koynashen.

History 
During the Soviet period, the village was a part of the Shusha District of the Nagorno-Karabakh Autonomous Oblast.

Historical heritage sites 
Historical heritage sites in and around the village include the medieval caravanserai of Pulen Glukh, a church built in 1658, and the 19th-century church of Surb Astvatsatsin.

Economy and culture 
The population is mainly engaged in agriculture and animal husbandry. As of 2015, the village has a municipal building, a house of culture, a school, and a medical centre.

Demographics 
The village had 176 inhabitants in 2005, and 190 inhabitants in 2015.

References

External links 

 
 

Populated places in Shushi Province
Populated places in Shusha District